Benoy Bose (born 25 November 1929) is an Indian boxer. He competed at the 1948 Summer Olympics and the 1952 Summer Olympics. In his first fight at the 1948 Summer Olympics, he lost to Francisco Núñez of Argentina.

References

External links
 

1929 births
Possibly living people
Indian male boxers
Olympic boxers of India
Boxers at the 1948 Summer Olympics
Boxers at the 1952 Summer Olympics
Place of birth missing (living people)
Featherweight boxers